Adrienne Porter Felt is an American computer scientist.

Education 
Porter Felt completed her PhD at UC Berkeley in 2012. Her dissertation research focused on computer security on mobile devices. Her advisor was David Wagner. Her 2011 paper on Android permissions security won the ACM SIGSAC test-of-time award in 2022.

Career 
After graduation, Porter Felt joined Google. Her work there focuses on computer security and Google Chrome. In 2014, she developed malware warnings in Chrome that are more intuitive for users. In 2016, she noted that the Google Chrome HTTPS lock icon looks more like a red purse than a lock. She conducted a study to design a more intuitive icon, and the new icon was deployed to users. In 2018, she worked on improvements to emoji in Google Chrome.

Personal life 
Porter Felt's father, Edward Porter Felt was killed in the September 11 attacks.

References

External links

American computer scientists
Living people
Computer security specialists
Year of birth missing (living people)